is a retired Japanese Nippon Professional Baseball pitcher with the Saitama Seibu Lions in Japan's Pacific League.

External links

Living people
1982 births
Japanese baseball players
Nippon Professional Baseball pitchers
Yokohama BayStars players
Seibu Lions players
Saitama Seibu Lions players
Baseball people from Kōchi Prefecture